The 2004 Clásica de San Sebastián was the 24th edition of the Clásica de San Sebastián cycle race and was held on 7 August 2004. The race started and finished in San Sebastián. The race was won by Miguel Ángel Martín Perdiguero of the Saunier Duval team.

General classification

References

Clásica de San Sebastián
San
2004 UCI Road World Cup
August 2004 sports events in Europe